11:11 Reset is the seventh studio album by American singer Keyshia Cole. It was released by Epic Records on October 20, 2017. It succeeds Cole's sixth album Point of No Return (2014). The album was preceded by the release of two singles—"You" and "Incapable". 11:11 Reset peaked at number 37 on the US Billboard 200.

Background
In December 2016, it was announced that Cole signed a new record deal with Epic Records. In an interview with Rap-Up magazine, she announced the name of her upcoming album titled 11:11 Reset stating:

Singles
"You" featuring Remy Ma and French Montana was released as the album's lead single on January 27, 2017. The music video premiered on February 27, 2017.

"Incapable" was released as the album's second single on August 25, 2017. The music video was released on October 6, 2017.

In February 2018, Keyshia announced via Instagram that the third single will be a brand new song because she is re-releasing the album just in time for the RESET world tour.

Critical reception

Allmusic editor Andy Kellman found that 11:11 Reset "handily tops her 2014 set with comparatively nuanced and richer songs." He continued on to say that "They ultimately beget a fluidity the first six full-lengths lack. As ever, Cole's love life is marked by volatility and unfaithfulness [...] Cole shuns the cheater, cuts ties, consoles and assures herself, and lays out her expectations for settling down – all familiar ground for the artist. She nonetheless finds new ways to cover most of it, and does so with a level of restraint that makes her maximum-effort moments all the more powerful."

Commercial performance
On November 11, 2017, the album debuted at number 37 on the Billboard 200, with first-week sales of 13,377 units (9,420 in pure album sales) in the United States. The album also peaked at number six on the US Top R&B/Hip-Hop Albums and number three on the Top R&B Albums. In the United Kingdom, the album peaked at number 36 on the UK R&B Albums charts.

Track listing

Notes 
 denotes co-producer

Charts

Release history

References

2017 albums
Keyshia Cole albums
Epic Records albums
Sony Music albums